Ally Blake is an Australian writer of romance novels.

Biography

Ally Blake was born in a small town in Outback Queensland, Australia. She graduated from St Peters Lutheran College in Brisbane. She earned her bachelor's degree from the University of Queensland, with a double English major.

She was a cheerleader for both the Brisbane Broncos football team and the Gold Coast Rollers basketball teams.  She was a contracted dancer on The Footy Show for Channel Nine in Brisbane.  For two years, she was the secretary of the Queensland branch of the Australian Cinematographers Society.

Ally married in Las Vegas in 2000, and since then has lived in both Melbourne and Brisbane.  She and her husband have three children.

Career

In 2003, Ally's first romance novel, The Wedding Wish, was published by Harlequin Mills & Boon.  This book was nominated by industry magazine Romantic Times as Best First Series Romance of 2004.  Since that time she has sold 16 novels, both for the Harlequin Romance and Modern Heat imprints.  In 2007 she was nominated for the reader judged HOLT (Honoring Outstanding Literary Talent) Medallion for Best Traditional Romance published in 2006.

Ally has now sold over four million books worldwide in over twenty-five countries.  She has hosted courses at public libraries and romance writing conventions and has appeared in the print media and on A Current Affair.  She also designs romance author websites including those for award winners Liz Fielding, Lucy Gordon and Trish Wylie as well as her own

Bibliography

Harlequin Romances

Hired: The Boss's Bride ~ October  2008
Falling for the Rebel Heir ~ March 2008
Millionaire To The Rescue ~ October  2007
Billionaire On Her Doorstep ~ June 2007
Meant-To-Be Mother ~ January 2007
Wanted: Outback Wife (Miniseries: Brides of Bella Lucia) ~ October 2006
A Father In The Making ~ April 2006
The Shock Engagement (Miniseries: Office Gossip) ~ November 2005
Marriage Make-Over ~ January 2005
Marriage Material ~ June 2004
The Wedding Wish ~ December 2003

Silhouette Romances

A Mother For His Daughter ~ December 2006
How To Marry A Billionaire ~ November 2006

Modern Heat (aka Modern Extra Sensual Romances)

The Magnate's Indecent Proposal ~ May 2008
Steamy Surrender ~ September 2007
Getting Down To Business ~ April 2007

Other
Sizzle, Seduce & Simmer ~ November 2007
The Barrackers Are Shouting (by fans of the Collingwood Football Club)

External links 

Australian romantic fiction writers
Australian women novelists
Living people
Year of birth missing (living people)
Women romantic fiction writers